Antony Holland  (28 March 1920 – 29 July 2015) was an English actor, playwright and theatre director who until his death in 2015 lived on Gabriola Island, British Columbia, Canada.

History 
Holland completed his drama training at the Labour Stage in London. Shortly after, he was called into His Majesty's Armed Forces as a signalman at the onset of the Second World War. While training at the coastal town of South Shields, he put on a play in a local abandoned theatre. Holland continued to mount productions in his spare time throughout the course of the war. He was granted the officers' lounge for rehearsals and cast approximately 100 men in a wide variety of roles, including parts that required playing women. His plays continued through the North African Campaign, crossed the desert, and made it to Cairo where he would mount productions at the Khedivial Opera House. So successful were his plays that the military requisitioned stage materials for more elaborate productions. Holland was transferred into military intelligence where he served out the remainder of the war.

In 1946, Laurence Olivier founded the Bristol Old Vic Theatre School where Holland was vice principal for nearly a decade. Holland moved to Vancouver in 1957 and remained in British Columbia until his death in July 2015. In 1965, he founded a theatre arts program at the King Edward Campus of Vancouver Community College. The school relocated to Langara College and formally took on the name of Studio 58. Holland retired as artistic director in 1985, and returned to professional acting, directing and writing. Shortly after moving to Gabriola Island, he established a new theatre company at the Gabriola Theatre Centre.

Select credits

Honours 
 The recipient of three Jessie Richardson Theatre Awards and numerous nominations.
 The recipient of four Lifetime Achievement Awards.
 Elected into the BC Entertainment Hall of Fame.
 The Antony Holland Scholarship at Langara College was made in his honour.
 Member of the Order of Canada.

References

External links

English male stage actors
2015 deaths
1920 births
Members of the Order of Canada
British Army personnel of World War II
Studio 58 people
British Army soldiers